Free Escape (Italian: Libera uscita) is a 1951 Italian comedy film directed by Duilio Coletti and starring Nino Taranto, Ludmilla Dudarova and Laura Gore.

The film's sets were designed by Alberto Boccianti. It was made at Cinecittà.

Cast
 Nino Taranto as Domenico Errichiello  
 Ludmilla Dudarova as Signora Quaglia  
 Laura Gore as Rosetta  
 Nyta Dover as Susanna 
 Luigi Pavese as Signor Quaglia  
 Carlo Croccolo as Pinozzo Molliconi  
 Elena Altieri 
 Guglielmo Inglese 
 Simona Gori
 Galeazzo Benti 
 Arturo Bragaglia 
 Ciro Berardi 
 Enrico Luzi as Regista di fotoromanzi 
 Gigi Reder 
 Mario Lauri 
 Nerio Bernardi

References

Bibliography
 Pasquale Sorrenti. Il cinema e la Puglia. Schena, 1984.

External links

1951 films
1951 comedy films
Italian comedy films
1950s Italian-language films
Films directed by Duilio Coletti
Films shot at Cinecittà Studios
Italian black-and-white films
1950s Italian films